Siri Sylvia Patricia von Reis (February 10, 1931 – August 3, 2021) was an American botanist, author, and poet of half-Finnish and half-Swedish ancestry. She was an authority on traditional medicine. She was also an investigator at the New York Botanical Garden.

Personal life
Siri von Reis was the daughter of Bror Gustav von Reis (1903–1975), the president of Detroit Broach and Machine Company of Rochester, Michigan, and Donna Tavastila von Reis (1908–1994). She received a bachelor's degree in botany from the University of Michigan in 1953. After breaking off an engagement to the electronics executive Arthur G. B. Metcalf in 1959, she married the Jewish American banker Arthur Goodhart Altschul, a Goldman Sachs Group partner and member of the Lehman banking family. They had three children together, Arthur Jr. (born 1964), Emily Helen (born 1966), and broadcast journalist Serena Altschul (born 1970), before their divorce in 1972.

References

Bibliography
 Schultes, R.E.; Altschul, S. 2005: Ethnobotany: The Evolution of a Discipline
 Reis, Siri von 2001: The Love-Suicides at Sonezaki and other poems
 Altschul, S.; Lipp, F.J.Jr. 1982: New Plant Sources for Drugs and Foods from the New York Botanical Garden Herbarium
 Altschul, S. 1977: Exploring the Herbarium.
 Altschul, S. 1975. Drugs & Foods From Little-Known Plants - Notes in Harvard University Herbaria
 Altschul, S. 1972: The Genus Anadenanthera in Amerindian Cultures

1931 births
2021 deaths
21st-century American botanists
Writers from New York City
American people of Swedish descent
American people of Finnish descent
Lehman family
20th-century American writers
21st-century American writers
21st-century American women writers
20th-century American women writers
Scientists from New York (state)